Qatar competed at the 2018 Asian Games in Jakarta and Palembang, Indonesia, from 18 August to 2 September 2018. Qatar represented by 20 national sport federations, with a plan of over 250 competitors who will be participating across 30 disciplines and also at the 2018 Asian Para Games.

Medalists

The following Qatar competitors won medals at the Games.

|  style="text-align:left; width:78%; vertical-align:top;"|

|  style="text-align:left; width:22%; vertical-align:top;"|

Competitors 
The following is a list of the number of competitors representing Qatar that participated at the Games:

Archery 

Recurve

Compound

Athletics 

Qatar entered twenty six athletes (24 men's and 2 women's) to participate in the athletics competition at the Games.

Basketball 

Summary

5x5 basketball
Qatar men's team entered the competition and drawn in the group C.

Men's tournament

Roster
The following is the Qatar roster in the men's basketball tournament of the 2018 Asian Games.

Group C

3x3 basketball
Qatar also set a men's and women's team that competed in the  3-on-3 basketball. The men's team placed in pool C and the women's team in pool A based on the FIBA 3x3 federation ranking.

Men's tournament

Roster
The following is the Qatar roster in the men's 3x3 basketball tournament of the 2018 Asian Games.
Babacar Dieng
Moustafa Fouda
Nedim Muslic
Seydou Ndoye

Pool C

Quarter-final

Women's tournament

Roster
The following is the Qatar roster in the women's 3x3 basketball tournament of the 2018 Asian Games.
Sara Al-Saadi
Yasmin Koshkosh
Mona Saad
Alaa Soliman

Pool A

Bowling 

Men

Boxing 

Men

Diving 

Qatar entered two men's diver at the Games, but one diver (Mohammed Shewaiter) did not participate in any diving events.

Men

Equestrian 

Qatar was named seven riders at the Games. Three riders participated in the eventing event, while four riders in the jumping event.

Eventing

Jumping

# – indicates that the score of this rider does not count in the team competition, since only the best three results of a team are counted.

Fencing 

Qatar competed in the fencing competition at the Games, but their fencer ended their challenge at the group stage.

Individual

Team

Football 

Qatar men's team played in the group B at the Games.

Summary

Men's tournament 

Roster

Pool B

Golf 

Men

Gymnastics

Handball 

As the reigning champion, Qatar will compete at the Games with a strong 18-member squad.

Summary

Men's tournament

Roster

Rasheed Yusuff
Bertrand Roiné
Rafael Capote
Frankis Marzo
Abdulrazzaq Murad
Danijel Šarić
Goran Stojanović
Firas Chaieb
Amine Guehis
Allaedine Berrached
Wajdi Sinen
Ahmad Madadi
Youssef Benali
Moustafa Heiba
Anis Zouaoui
Ameen Zakkar

Group A

Main round (Group I)

Semifinals

Gold medal game

Judo 

Qatar put up 2 judokas at the Games.

Men

Karate 

Qatar participated in the karate competition at the Games with three men's athletes.

Paragliding 

Men

Rowing 

Women

Sailing

Men

Mixed

Shooting 

Qatar competed in shooting competition at the Games. Hamad Ali Al-Marri became the first Qatari athletes who took the medals, by winning the bronze in the men's double trap event.

Men

Women

Mixed team

Squash 

Singles

Team

Swimming

Men

Table tennis 

Individual

Team

Taekwondo 

Poomsae

Kyorugi

Tennis 

Men

Triathlon 

Individual

Volleyball 

Qatar participated in the beach volleyball competition with two men's team. The world 10th ranked, Ahmed Janko and Cherif Samba captured the fourth gold medal for the contingent, after won the title on 28 August.  Qatar also competed in the men's indoor competition and drawn in the pool F.

Beach volleyball

Indoor volleyball

Men's tournament

Team roster
The following is the Qatar roster in the men's volleyball tournament of the 2018 Asian Games.

Head coach:  Camilo Soto

Pool F

Playoff

Quarterfinal

Semifinal

Bronze medal match

Weightlifting 

Qatar put up their weightlifter at the Games. The 20 years old Faris Ibrahim won a silver in the 94 kg on 25 August.

Men

Wrestling 

Qatar competed in freestyle and Greco-Roman event at the wrestling competition. Abdulrahman Ibrahim reaching into the bronze medal match but losing to Japanese wrestler.

Men's freestyle

Men's Greco-Roman

See also 
 Qatar at the 2018 Asian Para Games

References 

Nations at the 2018 Asian Games
2018
Asian Games